Pleasure Bent is a debut album by saxophonist Roland Alexander, with trumpeter Marcus Belgrave, recorded in 1961, and released on the New Jazz label.

Reception

The AllMusic review by Alex Henderson stated, "Although the tenor saxman's Coltrane-influenced debut album, Pleasure Bent, was recorded in 1961, this vinyl LP has more in common with the bop-oriented Coltrane of the mid- to late '50s. ... That isn't to say that Alexander is a flat-out clone of Coltrane -- he was also influenced by Sonny Rollins and other hard boppers -- but there is no denying that Coltrane's playing is a strong influence on this record ... his roots were hard bop, and hard bop is exactly what he plays on this decent, if derivative, LP."

Track listing
All compositions by Roland Alexander except where noted
 "Pleasure Bent" – 11:10
 "I'll Be Around" (Alec Wilder) – 5:20
 "Dorman Road" – 5:30
 "Lil's Blues" – 7:20
 "Orders to Take Out" – 7:00
 "My Melancholy Baby" (Ernie Burnett, George Norton) – 5:00

Personnel
 Roland Alexander  –  tenor saxophone
 Marcus Belgrave  –  trumpet
 Ronnie Mathews  –  piano
 Gene Taylor  –  bass
 Clarence "Scoby" Stroman  –  drums

References

New Jazz Records albums
Roland Alexander albums
Marcus Belgrave albums
1961 albums
Albums recorded at Van Gelder Studio
Albums produced by Ozzie Cadena